"Nature Farming" was established in 1936 by Mokichi Okada, the founder of the Church of World Messianity, an agricultural system originally called .

Offshoots such as the Sekai Kyusei Kyo, promoting ‘Kyusei nature farming’, and the Mokichi Okada Association formed after his death to continue promoting the work in Japan and South-East Asia.

ZZ2, a farming conglomerate in South Africa has translated the term to Afrikaans, "Natuurboerdery".

According to the International Nature Farming Research Center in Nagano, Japan, it is based on the theories that:
 Fertilizers pollute the soil and weaken its power of production.
 Pests would break out from the excessive use of fertilizers
 The difference in disease incidence between resistant and susceptible plants is attributed to nutritional conditions inside the body.
 Vegetables and fruits produced by nature farming taste better than those by chemical farming.
The term is sometimes used for an alternative farming philosophy of Masanobu Fukuoka.

Natural Farming

Another Japanese farmer and philosopher, Masanobu Fukuoka, conceived of an alternative farming system in the 1930s separately from Okada and used the same Japanese characters to describe it. This is generally translated in English as "Natural Farming" although agriculture researcher Hu-lian Xu claims that "nature farming" is the correct literal translation of the Japanese term.

See also
 No-dig gardening
 No-till farming

Bibliography
 自然農法解說 / Shizen nōhō kaisetsu by Mokichi Okada. Publisher: 榮光社出版部 Eikōsha Shuppanbu, Tōkyō 1951.

References

External links

Environmental conservation
Organic farming
Agriculture and the environment
Rural community development
Systems ecology